

The South Carolina Aquarium, located in Charleston, South Carolina, opened on May 19, 2000 on the historic Charleston Harbor. It is home to more than ten thousand plants and animals including North American river otters, loggerhead sea turtles, alligators, great blue herons, owls, lined seahorses, jellyfish, pufferfish, green moray eels, horseshoe crabs, sea stars, pythons, and sharks. The Aquarium also features a Touch Tank, where patrons may touch horseshoe crabs, Atlantic stingrays, and other marine animals.

Exhibits
The Aquarium, jutting out  into the Charleston Harbor, encompasses the Southeast Appalachian Watershed as found in South Carolina: The Mountain Forest, the Piedmont, the Coastal Plain, the Coast, and the Ocean.  The  building includes 9 galleries featuring 6,000-7,000 amazing aquatic animals, from river otters and sharks to loggerhead turtles, in more than 100 exhibits.  A rotating exhibit on the first floor originally featured "Secrets of the Amazon," a collection of animals and plants native to the Amazon River basin. In 2008, this exhibit changed to "Camp Carolina," a simulation of a camping experience in the mountains of South Carolina. Showcased animals include skunks, barn owls, snakes, and a bald eagle. Penguin Planet, a changing exhibit, was opened from 2009 to 2010 and featured four Magellanic penguins. In March 2011, the Aquarium reopened the renovated Salt Marsh exhibit which features a feed the stingray experience. In the spring of 2012, the Aquarium opened a new exhibit in the changing exhibit space called "Madagascar Journey" featuring ring-tailed lemurs on loan from the Duke Primate Center, tomato frogs, and a Nile crocodile. The rotating exhibit space later underwent a major renovation on the Aquarium's main floor to reinvent space for a now permanent exhibit: Zucker Family Sea Turtle Recovery, opened to the public in May 2017. The exhibit makes the real-life rehabilitation of sick and injured sea turtles visible to every guest who visits the Aquarium. Interactive stations further enable guests to learn the causes of sea turtle stranding and to practice diagnosing a mock patient. A theater provides a glimpse into what happens after a turtle's time in recovery. Zucker Family Sea Turtle Recovery also provides space for the McNair Center for Sea Turtle Research and Conservation.

Sea Turtle Care Center
In addition to education efforts in support of a healthy loggerhead sea turtle habitat, the South Carolina Aquarium utilizes its facilities to operate a Sea Turtle Hospital. The South Carolina Department of Natural Resources transports injured or stranded sea turtles to the hospital, after which aquarium staff and volunteers nurture the animal back to health. A staff veterinarian can perform surgery, administer x-rays, IVs, and even provide blood transfusions to turtles that are severely anemic. As of fall 2017, a CT scanner provides Sea Turtle Care Center staff with additional capabilities. Zucker Family Sea Turtle Recovery doubled the Aquarium's capacity for treating sick and injured sea turtle patients.

Rehabilitated turtles are taken to a local beach and allowed to return to the ocean once the South Carolina Department of Natural Resources clears them for release. The average turnaround time for an injured turtle is 7–8 months. The South Carolina Aquarium has rehabilitated and released over 250 sea turtles since 2000. The McNair Center for Sea Turtle Research and Conservation serves as the Aquarium's in-house research facility especially for sea turtle knowledge.

Staffing and Funding

The Aquarium has more than 140 paid staff and more than 300 volunteers. The volunteer program has become a model in the community.

The South Carolina Aquarium is a private not-for-profit education and conservation organization, funded by a combination of ticket, concession and souvenir sales, and corporate, government and private donations.

Gallery

References

External links

Aquaria in South Carolina
Buildings and structures in Charleston, South Carolina
Tourist attractions in Charleston, South Carolina